"Keep On Working" is a song written and composed by the English musician Pete Townshend, guitarist for the Who. The song was released as a single, and is on the album Empty Glass.

Background
Like its album-mate "Empty Glass", "Keep On Working" was a leftover from Who Are You, a 1978 album by Townshend's band The Who. However, upon Townshend's decision to make a solo album, the song was resurrected.

Pete Townshend has since said that the song was created in an attempt to replicate Kinks' songwriter Ray Davies' style of writing. In 1982, Townshend said, "Ray's always been a big influence on me. I've never been able to write in the same way, though I've often tried. In fact, I'm terrible at it. I think 'Keep on Working' tries to be a Kinks song but it just doesn't work."

Release and reception
In 1980, "Keep On Working" was released as the final single from Empty Glass in the UK, following his success with "Let My Love Open the Door" and "Rough Boys". Backed with its fellow Empty Glass track "Jools and Jim", the song was a commercial flop, failing to chart at all. The single wasn't released in the US, where "A Little Is Enough" was issued instead.

AllMusic critic Stephen Thomas Erlewine criticized "Keep On Working" for being "a little artier than it needs to be".

References

1980 singles
Pete Townshend songs
Songs written by Pete Townshend
Song recordings produced by Pete Townshend
1980 songs
Atco Records singles